John Pollini (born October 15, 1945 in Boston, Massachusetts) is an American art historian, archeologist, and educator. A scholar of Ancient Rome, Pollini is the USC Associates Professor of Art History at the University of Southern California.

Career
Born in Boston to Isabell and Frederick, Pollini graduated magna cum laude from the University of Washington with a Bachelor of Arts in Classics in 1968. He then continued on to the University of California, Berkeley, where he received a Master of Arts and a Doctor of Philosophy in Ancient History and Mediterranean Archaeology, in 1973 and 1978 respectively.

In 1979, Pollini began his teaching career as a Visiting Assistant Professor of Classics at Johns Hopkins University. A year later, he was hired to a dual role there as Assistant Professor of Classics and Curator of the Archeological Museum. In 1987, Pollini moved to the University of Southern California as Associate Professor of Classics and Art History. Four years later, he was made Professor of Art History, and in 2018, the professorship was endowed as the USC Associates Professor of Art History. Pollini has also held administrative posts there, namely that of Chair of the Department of Art History from 1990 to 1993, and Dean of the School of Fine Arts from 1993 to 1996.

A scholar of ancient history and classical archeology, Pollini has worked extensively on such subjects as the Ara Pacis, the Augustus of Prima Porta, the Farnese Cup, and the Skyphos. In 2006, he was awarded a Guggenheim Fellowship to further work on similar topics.

See also
List of Guggenheim Fellowships awarded in 2006
List of Johns Hopkins University people
List of people from Boston
List of University of California, Berkeley alumni in arts and media 
List of University of Southern California people
List of University of Washington alumni

References

External links
University of Southern California profile

Living people
1945 births
Writers from Boston
American archaeologists
American art historians
University of Washington alumni
University of California, Berkeley alumni
Johns Hopkins University faculty
University of Southern California faculty